The 1st Canadian Army Tank Brigade, later known as 1st Canadian Armoured Brigade, was an armoured brigade of the Canadian Army, raised during the Second World War. The brigade was composed of the 11th, 12th and 14th Canadian Armoured regiments and saw service in the Italian campaign and later in north-west Europe. It was one of only two independent Canadian armoured brigades in combat, the other being 2nd Canadian Armoured Brigade.

History
The 1st Canadian Tank Brigade was formed on 4 February 1941. The Ontario Regiment and The Three Rivers Regiment were transferred from the incomplete 1st Canadian Armoured Division to provide the nucleus of the 1st Canadian Tank Brigade in February 1941. In March, The Calgary Regiment joined the new brigade from 2nd Division. The Fort Garry Horse were also originally part of the brigade, but transferred to the 5th Canadian (Armoured) Division in May 1941.

The 1st Tank Brigade moved to the United Kingdom in the summer of 1941; personnel arrived in the Clyde on 30 June and were promptly moved to Salisbury Plain where they were issued sufficient Churchill tanks for training. The Calgary Regiment participated in the disastrous Dieppe landing in 1942. Issued brand new M4 "Sherman" tanks, the entire brigade moved to the Mediterranean, with The Three Rivers Regiment participating in the assault landing at Pachino. The remainder of the brigade landed with the follow-up convoy of 13 July and served alongside the Three Rivers Regiment for the final weeks of the Allied invasion of Sicily. The 1st Tank Brigade's role in the latter operations was largely one of fire support, the rugged terrain limiting the role of the armoured corps. The fight for Sicily ended with 1st Tank in reserve. Preparing for Operation Baytown, the Allied invasion of Italy, it was redesignated 1st Canadian Armoured Brigade in August 1943. Although reorganized as an armoured brigade, no motor battalion served under command. Having established a reputation for both courage and skill, the Canadian tankers were in constant demand by senior British commanders.

The brigade took part in the landings of the Eighth Army on the toe of Italy in Operation Baytown in September 1943. Its regiments participated in the Battles of Potenza, Termoli, Ortona. During the fourth and final Battle of Monte Cassino in May 1944, the brigade helped break the Winter Line (Gustav Line), crossing the Gari River in support of the 8th Indian Division. Its regiments helped the 1st Canadian Division and the 78th Division in breaking the Hitler Line. It cooperated with the XIII Corps in the Battle of Lake Trasimeno. It was active in the crossing of the Arno River and later fought on the Gothic Line.

Combined with the 1st Canadian Infantry Division and 5th Canadian Armoured Division as part of I Canadian Corps, the 1st Canadian Armoured Brigade was moved from the Italian Front and joined the First Canadian Army in Northern Europe at the beginning of 1945. Here it participated in the crossing of the IJssel River. In its two incarnations as 1st Tank and 1st Armoured, the brigade's service at Dieppe, France, in Sicily, Italy and Northwest Europe earned it the distinction of the longest and widest service of any brigade of the Canadian Army during the Second World War.

Organization
The battle order starting 4 February 1941:
 1st Canadian Armoured Brigade Headquarters Squadron (The Prince Edward Island Light Horse)
 11th Armoured Regiment (The Ontario Regiment)
 12th Armoured Regiment (Three Rivers Regiment)
 14th Armoured Regiment (Calgary Regiment)
 "A" Squadron, 25th Armoured Delivery Regiment (The Elgin Regiment) (later "B" Squadron)
 1st Canadian Armoured Brigade Signals, Royal Canadian Corps of Signals
 1st Canadian Armoured Brigade 83 Company (RCASC)
 1st Canadian Light Field Ambulance(No. 2 CLFA) (RCAMC)
 1st Canadian Armoured Brigade Workshop, RCEME)
 1st Canadian Armoured Brigade Ordnance, PG PK (RCOC)
 1st Canadian Heavy Recovery (RCEME)
 1st Canadian Army Tank Troops Workshop (RCEME)
 1st Canadian Assault Troop (CAC)

Commanding officers

Major General F. F. Worthington (5 March 1941- 28 January 1942)
Brigadier General R.A Wyman (28 January 1942- 27 February 1944) 
Brigadier General W. Murphy (27 February 1944 - )

References

Canadian World War II brigades
Armoured units and formations of Canada in World War II
Military units and formations disestablished in the 1940s